Edward J. Konieczny (born December 20, 1954)  was the fifth bishop of the Episcopal Diocese of Oklahoma, United States. After studies at Church Divinity School of the Pacific, he was ordained to the diaconate and priesthood in 1994. He was elected bishop on May 5, 2007, and consecrated as such September 15, 2007. He is often called "Bishop Ed." He served until his successor was installed in August 2020. In 2022 he was appointed by Oklahoma Governor Kevin Stitt to the Oklahoma Pardon and Parole Board, replacing Adam Luck, whom the governor had asked to step down.

Early life
Bishop Ed was born December 20, 1954, at Fairchild Air Force Base in Spokane, Washington. In 1955, the family, including Ed and his two siblings, older sister Helene and younger brother William, moved to Anaheim, California.

Law enforcement career
After graduating from high school, Konieczny continued his education in a community college on a part-time schedule, while he began a career in law enforcement. He earned an AA certificate in Administration of Justice and a BA degree in Criminal Justice. From 1972 to 1975, he held several civilian positions in law enforcement such as a Police Cadet, desk officer, and police dispatcher.  He served as an officer with the police departments of Anaheim and Garden Grove, California from 1975 until 1993, earning several commendations including two Meritorious Service Commendations. His assignments included Uniformed Patrol, Child Abuse/Sexual Assault, Crime Task force and Vice (narcotics).   He was twice named Instructor of the Year by the California District Attorney's Association. Prior to leaving law enforcement, he was a School Resource and Community Services Officer teaching the DARE program in public schools.

Religious career
After 17 years in police work, Konieczny's career turned toward religion. He enrolled in the Church Divinity School of the Pacific, where he earned a Master of Divinity degree, and was ordained as a priest and a deacon in the Episcopal Church in 1994. He continued his religious education at Seabury-Western Theological Seminary, where he earned a Doctor of Ministry in Church Growth and Development. Later in his church career, both schools have awarded him a Doctor of Divinity degree, honoris cause.

Election as bishop
On May 5, 2007, Rev. Dr. Konieczny, then serving as rector of St. Matthews Episcopal Church in Grand Junction, Colorado, was elected as the Bishop of the Episcopal Diocese of Oklahoma. The Diocese of Oklahoma covers the entire state , 69 congregations, three Diocesan Schools, two Retirement/Assisted Living Homes, a Camp and Conference Center and multiple other institutions and ministries.   The election was held in the St. Paul's Cathedral at Oklahoma City. Out of six candidates, he received the most lay votes and the most clergy votes on the first ballot. His predecessor as Bishop of Oklahoma was Robert M. Moody, who had been elected in 1987, and had served since 1989. Bishop Ed announced his retirement effective in 2020, and on December 14, 2019, the diocesan convention elected Poulson Reed as bishop coadjutor. Reed succeeded him as Bishop Diocesan December 31, 2020.

Activities as bishop
In addition to the normal duties as bishop of a diocese, he has played an important and highly visible role in the national and international church, such as: member of Bishops United Against Gun Violence, member of Executive Council of The Episcopal Church, member of Executive Committee of Executive Council of The Episcopal Church, member of the Presiding Bishop's Council of Advice, member of the Presiding Bishop Transition and Installation Committee, Co-Chair of the Joint Nominating Committee for the Election of the Presiding Bishop, and Key Note Speaker at the Reclaiming the Gospel of Peace Conference. Additionally, he serves as the Episcopal Representative of the Episcopal Church to the Anglican Consultative Council; Chair of the Brazil Bilateral Committee; member of the Anglian Bishops in Dialogue Consultation; and established a Companion Relationship between the Diocese of Oklahoma the Anglican Diocese of Uruguay. In 2017, he was instrumental in partnering with Bishop Jacop Ayebo and completing construction of St. James Church in Bolgatanga, Ghana.  Bishop

Bishop Konieczny, along with 16 other religious leaders representing the Oklahoma Council of Churches, issued a public document, "Theological Statement in Opposition to the Death Penalty." The document refutes political arguments that the Bible supports (or even commands) the death penalty, and publicly calls for the Government of Oklahoma to abolish the death penalty in the state.

Oklahoma pardon and parole board 
In 2022, after Adam Luck was asked by Governor Kevin Stitt to resign from the Oklahoma Pardon and Parole Board, Stitt appointed Konieczny as replacement.  After the news picked up that he had signed the public document, "Theological Statement in Opposition to the Death Penalty," a statement was issued stating he had "assured the governor he is prepared, should he believe it to be appropriate, to vote in support of the death penalty in accordance with the law of Oklahoma." Within his first three months of serving on the board, he voted against granting April Wilkens a parole hearing,  but the board voted to fully recommend parole for the "Crossbow Killer," Jimmie Stohler. In April 2022, after Richard Smothermon questioned the administrative parole process, Konieczny was also "critical of the administrative parole process" and "said the board’s role as a rubber stamp opens it up to litigation. In the past, previous board members Adam Luck and Kelly Doyle, were harassed with lawsuits from DA David Prater.

Personal
Ed Konieczny and his wife Debbie married in 1978. They have two sons, one daughter-in-law and five grandchildren. In his spare time, Bishop Ed enjoys travel, golf and cooking. He also has a General Aviation Pilot license.

See also

 Oklahoma Pardon and Parole Board
 Cathy Stocker 
 Richard Smothermon
 David Prater (attorney)
 Larry Morris

Notes

References

See also

 List of Episcopal bishops of the United States
 Historical list of the Episcopal bishops of the United States

External links
Episcopal Church website

Living people
People from Spokane, Washington
People from Anaheim, California
People from Grand Junction, Colorado
1954 births
Church Divinity School of the Pacific alumni
Episcopal bishops of Oklahoma